Tipograful Român ('Romanian Typographer') was a Romanian language newspaper, which began publishing in 1865. Tipograful Român was the first Romanian workers' newspaper.

References

Romanian-language newspapers
Publications established in 1865